The Complete Elvis Presley Masters is a box set by American singer Elvis Presley. It was released on October 19, 2010, by RCA Records and Legacy Recordings. The box set covers the majority of Presley's recording career, bringing together all 711 master recordings released during his lifetime.

Contents

The box set contains 711 original master recordings as released during Presley's lifetime and 103 additional rare recordings, contained on 30 compact discs. The set omits the recordings made for the 1977 Elvis in Concert TV special and album. The box set also features a 240–page hardcover book with complete discography produced exclusively for this collection, researched and written by Ernst Jørgensen and Peter Guralnick. It includes an individually numbered certificate of authenticity.

This box set should not be confused with the Franklin Mint compilation Elvis: The Complete Masters Collection, which does not contain the rare recordings and lacks the chronological sequencing of the songs but does come with a replica of Elvis's first 7-inch single.

Track listing

References

External links
 
 

Elvis Presley compilation albums
2010 compilation albums
RCA Records compilation albums
Compilation albums published posthumously